Malliswari or Malleswari may refer to: 

 Malliswari (1951 film), 1951 Telugu film directed by B. N. Reddi
 Malliswari (2004 film), 2004 Telugu film directed by K. Vijaya Bhaskar
 Karnam Malleswari (born 1975), Indian weight lifter